Dizang Temple may refer to:

 Dizang Temple (Changchun), in Changchun, Jilin, China
 Dizang Temple (Fuzhou), in Fuzhou, Fujian, China

Buddhist temple disambiguation pages